2015 Vuelta can refer to:

 2015 Vuelta a España
 2015 Vuelta a Andalucía
 2015 Vuelta a Asturias
 2015 Vuelta a Burgos
 2015 Vuelta a Castilla y León
 2015 Vuelta a Colombia
 2015 Vuelta a la Comunidad de Madrid